Huang Rong is a fictional female protagonist in the wuxia novel The Legend of the Condor Heroes by Jin Yong. She also appears as a supporting character in the sequel, The Return of the Condor Heroes.

In The Legend of the Condor Heroes
Huang Rong was born to Huang Yaoshi and Feng Heng. Her mother died shortly after she was born and her father raised her all by himself on Peach Blossom Island. She was an intelligent child and quick learner, so her father imparted her with all his skills and knowledge. She flees from home after a quarrel with her father and disguises herself as a beggar by donning filthy rags.

Huang Rong meets Guo Jing for the first time in an inn while she was arguing with a waiter. Guo Jing feels sorry for her and decides to pay for her meal. Huang Rong finds him interesting and she orders all kinds of fine cuisine and shares with him. Guo Jing even gives her some gold ingots he received from Genghis Khan. When she asks, he offers her his prized Ferghana horse, a rare Central Asian breed. Since then, Huang Rong is attracted to Guo Jing as she sees that he is a simple, honest and innocent young lad.

Guo Jing and Huang Rong embark on adventure together even though Guo's teachers, the "Seven Freaks of Jiangnan", dislike Huang and oppose Guo's decision to be with her. They meet Hong Qigong, who teaches Guo Jing the Eighteen Dragon Subduing Palms (降龍十八掌） to repay Huang Rong's favours of preparing fine cuisine for him every day during the brief period of time he spent with them.

Hong Qigong initially refuses to teach Huang Rong any skills when he learns that she is the daughter of his friendly rival, Huang Yaoshi. However, he starts to like her for her adorable nature, and especially after she and Guo Jing saved him from Ouyang Feng. He fought with Ouyang Feng and won but was bitten by the latter's poisonous serpent, and lost all his inner energy while purging the venom from his body. He teaches Huang Rong his Dog Beating Staff Technique after deciding to pass on his position as the chief of the Beggars' Gang to her.

Huang Rong plays a significant role in Yang Kang's death although she does not kill him directly. Yang Kang attacks her with a palm strike in an attempt to prevent her from revealing the truth behind the murders he committed. However, instead, he hits the spikes on the soft armour she is wearing. The armour was incidentally stained with venom from a rare snake bred by Ouyang Feng and the poison seeps through Yang Kang's wounds into his body and kills him eventually.

Towards the end of the novel, on the summit of Mount Hua, Huang Yaoshi finally consents to his daughter's marriage to Guo Jing.

In The Return of the Condor Heroes
Guo Jing and Huang Rong play supporting roles in the character development of the protagonist Yang Guo in the sequel. The couple have three children (Guo Fu, Guo Xiang, and Guo Polu) and have also accepted the brothers Wu Xiuwen and Wu Dunru as their students.

During their first meeting with Yang Guo, Guo Jing accepts the boy immediately and wants to raise him like a son and groom him to become a young hero. However, Huang Rong has reservations over her husband's decision. She feels that Yang Guo bears an uncanny resemblance to his late father in his attitude and behaviour, and does not fully trust the boy. Yang was taught only literary arts and Confucian values during the brief period of time he spent with the couple. This prejudice was reinforced when Huang always place the blame on Yang Guo whenever her daughter did something wrong to him, notably shown when she supports Guo Fu for slicing off Yang Guo's arm due to her believing that Yang Guo kidnapped her daughter and used her life to exchange for an antidote to a poison he suffers from due to an earlier incident with Gongsun Zhi (until she knows the truth and became regretful for blaming him).

Huang Rong is responsible for the split of Xiaolongnü and Yang Guo many times. Huang Rong's attitude towards Yang Guo changes over time as her husband shows high regard for the boy and especially after Yang Guo selflessly saved their family from danger again and again. At one point, she fears for Guo Fu's life, after her daughter sliced off Yang Guo's arm in a heated quarrel, but Yang Guo forgives Guo Fu and saves her life later. Huang Rong only fully trusts Yang Guo after he saved Guo Xiang from the Mongols in a later chapter.

Huang Rong joins her husband in defending Xiangyang and provides him with all the support to resist the Mongol invaders. They eventually defeated the Mongols and prolonged Xiangyang's existence as a Song territory for another 13 years before it finally fell to the Mongols prior to the events of the sequel The Heaven Sword and Dragon Saber.

In The Heaven Sword and Dragon Saber
In The Heaven Sword and Dragon Saber, it is revealed that the couple realise that the eventual fall of Xiangyang is inevitable, so they wrote their knowledge of martial arts and military strategy on scrolls and hid them separately in the blades of the Heaven Reliant Sword and Dragon Slaying Saber, in the hope that future generations would inherit their legacy. Huang Rong was killed along with the rest of her family (excluding Guo Xiang) after Xiangyang fell to the Mongols.

Character description
Huang Rong is described as a young beggar dressed in filthy clothing during her first appearance in The Legend of the Condor Heroes. Her face is stained with mud and her clothes are covered in dust. When Guo Jing agrees to meet her on the riverbank, she looks completely different from her earlier image, now that she is clean and dressed in beautiful clothes. Her appearance is described as "with skin whiter than snow, charm unrivalled by any, and a presence so stunning, one would almost blush from staring at her too intently". Guo Jing is taken aback by her new look.

Martial arts and skills

Huang Yaoshi
Huang Rong learnt most of her martial arts and skills from her father. Guo Jing is unable to fully grasp all these skills. Some of them are listed below.

 Peach Flower Fallen Hero Palm, known in later editions as Falling Flower Divine Sword Palm.
 Divine Flicking Finger is a technique of channelling a large amount of inner energy into a finger and releasing it with a precise amount of strength and control. It is used to propel objects towards enemies with force and accuracy.
 Jade Flute Swordplay is a type of swordplay that focuses on attacking an opponent's acupuncture points.

Hong Qigong
Huang Rong meets Hong Qigong while out on adventure with Guo Jing. Hong Qigong teaches them his skills to repay Huang Rong's favours of preparing fine cuisine for him. The skills Huang Rong learnt from Hong Qigong are as follows:

 Carefree Fist was created by Hong Qigong in his younger days. It requires flexibility and smoothness as its name "carefree" implies.
 Rain of Petals is a skill created by Hong Qigong to counter Ouyang Ke and his snakes. It involves using sewing needles as dart-like throwing weapons.
 Dog Beating Staff Technique is a skill known only to the Beggars' Gang's chief. This technique is one of the best among all pole weapons skills for its ever-changing styles and movements. Hong Qigong teaches Huang Rong when he decides to pass on his position as chief to her. Huang Rong teaches Lu Youjiao this skill later when she names him her successor.

Nine Yin Manual
The Nine Yin Manual is the most coveted martial arts manual of its time because of the incredible inner energy cultivation techniques and extraordinary skills it records. Guo Jing shares with Huang Rong after memorising and learning the skills in the book. Mastering the manual's skills allows both of them to maximise the potential of the various skills they had learnt earlier.

Miscellaneous skills and knowledge
Huang Rong acquired most of her knowledge of geography, medicine, strategy, mathematics, music, literature, etc. from her father. She also inherited her mother's eidetic memory.

She is also versed in the art of laying formations, such as the Eight Trigrams Formation, to counter enemies' advances. She uses her powers to make huge rocks and boulders form an array and maze to confuse enemies and force them to retreat.

Huang Rong is an excellent cook. She prepared several fine dishes for Hong Qigong to ask him to teach Guo Jing martial arts. Hong Qigong has a penchant for fine cuisine and could not resist the temptation that he has no choice but to keep his promise and teach Guo Jing.

In other media
Notable actresses who have portrayed Huang Rong in films and television series include Michelle Yim (1976), Barbara Yung (1983), Susanna Au-yeung (1983), Idy Chan (1988), Athena Chu (1994), Bonnie Ngai (1995), Zhou Xun (2003), Kong Lin (2006), Ariel Lin (2008), Yang Mingna (2014), Li Yitong (2017), and Gong Beibi (2022).

Huang Rong is a main character in the 2000 role-playing video game Shachou Eiyuuden: The Eagle Shooting Heroes, released by Sony Computer Entertainment for the PlayStation.

Family tree

Notes

References
  Tan, Xianmao (2005). Huang Rong: The Most Intelligent, Clever and Adorable Woman. In Rankings of Jin Yong's Characters. Chinese Agricultural Press.

Literary characters introduced in 1957
Jin Yong characters
The Legend of the Condor Heroes
The Return of the Condor Heroes
Condor Trilogy
Fictional women soldiers and warriors
Fictional wushu practitioners
Fictional Song dynasty people
Fictional Han people
Fictional characters from Zhejiang
Role-playing video game characters